Frank C. Ford (March 4, 1873 – March 21, 1965) was a Canadian lawyer. He served as Chancellor of the University of Alberta from 1942 to 1946.

Biography 
Ford was born in Toronto in 1873. He attended the University of Toronto and earned MA, LLB, and DCL degrees. Joining the Canadian Militia, Ford became a Captain with the 20th Halton Rifles. Appointed to King's Counsel in Saskatchewan in 1907, he was Deputy Attorney General of Saskatchewan from 1906 to 1910. With the move to Saskatchewan, Ford was also promoted to Major in the militia and later to Lieutenant Colonel taking command of the newly formed 95th Saskatchewan Rifles. He was appointed a King's Counsel in Ontario in 1910, and in Alberta in 1913. He served as a judge on the Supreme Court of Alberta from 1926 to 1954.

References

1873 births
1965 deaths
Canadian lawyers
People from Old Toronto
University of Toronto Faculty of Law alumni
Chancellors of the University of Alberta
Canadian King's Counsel

Canadian Militia officers
Lorne Scots (Peel, Dufferin and Halton Regiment)